PT Adaro Energy Indonesia Tbk is an Indonesian second-largest coal miner by production volume and its largest by market capitalisation. In the 2011 Forbes Global 2000, Adaro Energy was ranked as the 1527th -largest public company in the world. The company is an Indonesian energy group that focuses on coal mining through subsidiaries. The principal location is at Tabalong district in South Kalimantan, where the subsidiary PT Adaro Indonesia operates the largest single-site coal mine in the southern hemisphere (roughly 110,000 tons of coal per day). Adaro Energy operates under a first-generation CCA (coal co-operation agreement) with the Indonesian Government valid until 2022.

Adaro has been clearing land in Central Java for a 2,000MW coal plant, after a delay for more than four years due to land acquisition issues. The construction of Indonesia's largest coal plant, into which Adaro invested $4.2 billion, began in June 2016.

Adaro's strategy focuses on power generation as of the company's "three pillars" besides coal exports and logistics.

History
In 1976 the Indonesian Mines Department divided East and South Kalimantan into eight coal blocks and invited tenders for these blocks. Spanish state-owned enterprise Enadimsa (empresa nacional adaro investigaciones mineras s.a.) bid for Block 8 in the Tanjung district of South Kalimantan. Adaro Indonesia’s Coal Cooperation Agreement (CCA) was signed on Nov. 2, 1982. In 1989 a consortium of Australian and Indonesian companies purchased 80% of Adaro Indonesia from Enadimsa.

In 2008, Adaro Energy raised $1.3 billion in the country's largest ever initial public offering.

in 2017, the cost of coal were raised into 42 percent, Adaro's revenue were raised into $29.9 million on the first semester of 2017.

References

External links
http://www.adaro.com/

Coal companies of Indonesia
Indonesian companies established in 1982
Companies listed on the Indonesia Stock Exchange
2008 initial public offerings